Mimosa Jallow (born 17 June 1994) is a Finnish swimmer. She competed in the women's 100 metre backstroke event at the 2016 Summer Olympics. Jallow was born to a Gambian father and a Finnish mother in Jyväskylä.

References

External links
 

1994 births
Living people
Finnish female backstroke swimmers
Olympic swimmers of Finland
Swimmers at the 2016 Summer Olympics
Sportspeople from Jyväskylä
Finnish people of Gambian descent
European Aquatics Championships medalists in swimming
Swimmers at the 2020 Summer Olympics
21st-century Finnish women